Poimenesperus ligatus is a species of beetle in the family Cerambycidae. It was described by Karl Jordan in 1894. It is known from the Democratic Republic of the Congo, Cameroon, Gabon, and Equatorial Guinea.

References

laetus
Beetles described in 1894